The 2017–18 Texas Tech Red Raiders basketball team represented Texas Tech University in the 2017–18 NCAA Division I men's basketball season as a member of the Big 12 Conference. The Red Raiders were led by second-year coach Chris Beard. They played their home games at the United Supermarkets Arena in Lubbock, Texas. They finished the season 27–10, 11–7 in Big 12 play to finish in a tie for second place. They defeated Baylor in the quarterfinals of the Big 12 tournament before losing in the semifinals to West Virginia. They received an at-large bid to the NCAA tournament where they defeated Stephen F. Austin, Florida, and Purdue to advance to the Elite Eight for the first time in school history. In the Elite Eight, they were eliminated by Villanova.

Previous season 
The Red Raiders finished the 2016–17 season 18–14, 6–12 in Big 12 play to finish in a tie for seventh place. They lost in the first round of the Big 12 tournament to Texas.

Offseason

Departures

Incoming transfers

Recruits

Recruiting Class of 2017

Recruiting class of 2018

Roster

Schedule and results

|-
!colspan=12 style=|Exhibition

|-
!colspan=12 style=|Regular season

|-
!colspan=12 style=| Big 12 Tournament

|-
!colspan=12 style=| NCAA tournament

Rankings

*AP does not release post-NCAA tournament rankings.

References

Texas Tech Red Raiders basketball seasons
Texas Tech
Texas Tech
Texas Tech
Texas Tech